Shava is a band from Finland. The band calls its music Suomibhangra (Finnish Bhangra), a genre created by the band itself. Finnish Bhangra is a fusion of Finnish lyrics and Punjabi music. In 2010 the band released its first album Betoninen kotimaani, which was voted as the audience favorite for the Folk Music Record Of The Year 2010 in Finland. The band has toured in Finland, Italy, Germany, Switzerland, France, United Kingdom, Belgium, Netherlands Canada and Iceland.

Discography 
 Betoninen kotimaani (2010)
 Langaton yhteys (2015)

References

External links 
 Official site

Finnish musical groups
Bhangra (music) musical groups
Finnish world music groups
Musical groups established in 2010
2010 establishments in Finland